"Stolen Moments" is a song recorded by Canadian country music artist Jim Witter. It was released in 1993 as the third single from his debut album, Jim Witter. It peaked at number 5 on the RPM Country Tracks chart in February 1994. This song makes people cherish time with children.

Chart performance

Year-end charts

References

1993 songs
1993 singles
Jim Witter songs
Songs written by Jim Witter
FRE Records singles
Canadian Country Music Association Video of the Year videos